Novosyolovsky is a rural locality (a settlement) in Lebyazhensky Selsoviet Rural Settlement, Kursky District, Kursk Oblast, Russia. Population:

Geography 
The settlement is located 90 km from the Russia–Ukraine border, 10 km south-east of the district center – the town Kursk, 4.5 km from the selsoviet center – Cheryomushki.

 Streets
There are the following streets in the locality: Sadovaya and Tenistaya (31 houses).

 Climate
Novosyolovsky has a warm-summer humid continental climate (Dfb in the Köppen climate classification).

Transport 
Novosyolovsky is located 3.5 km from the road of regional importance  (Kursk – Bolshoye Shumakovo – Polevaya via Lebyazhye), 5 km from the road of intermunicipal significance  (Kursk – Petrin), 1 km from the road  (38H-416 – 38K-019), 5.5 km from the nearest railway station Konaryovo (railway line Klyukva — Belgorod).

The rural locality is situated 14 km from Kursk Vostochny Airport, 111 km from Belgorod International Airport and 203 km from Voronezh Peter the Great Airport.

References

Notes

Sources

Rural localities in Kursky District, Kursk Oblast